Dimsie Moves Up is the second of the Dimsie books by author Dorita Fairlie Bruce.  First published in 1921,  the book was illustrated by Wal Paget.  The protagonist  Dimsie is now a year older and had moved up one grade at the Jane Willard Foundation. The Western Morning News's review described it as "a book that should prove a delight to all school girls" and noted that school sports were featured and that "the rivalry between forms makes thrilling reading."

The book illustrates the strong Christian element in Bruce's work when a girl reveals that she has prayed every night for the recovery of an important lost book.

References

British children's novels
1921 British novels
Novels by Dorita Fairlie Bruce
Novels set in boarding schools
1921 children's books